Khamphoui Sisavatdy is the Prime Minister of the Royal Lao Government in Exile, serving in the position since the exiled government's formation in 2003. Khamphoui was re-elected Prime Minister in 2005 and 2010.

Beliefs

Khamphoui sees a constitutional monarchy as the best form of government for Laos, and that the Lao PDR's current government is dictatorial, and a puppet state of Vietnam. Khamphoui further believes that the Laotian people should be enabled to create the administration of their choice, and that the LPRP’s rule will eventually end, as more and more people will want to see beyond the “curtain” of an isolated society.

References

Laotian monarchists
Laotian anti-communists
Laotian politicians
Governments in exile
Prime Ministers of Laos
Living people
Year of birth missing (living people)